Somlenh Polokor was a Cambodian journal, published during the 1960s. It was closely connected to the clandestine Communist Party of Kampuchea.

References

Magazines published in Cambodia
Defunct political magazines
Magazines with year of disestablishment missing
Magazines with year of establishment missing
Communist magazines
Defunct magazines published in Cambodia